Janice Dean (born May 9, 1970) is a Canadian-born American weather presenter, television show host, and author based in New York City. She currently appears on Fox News, where she serves as co-host and weather anchor on Fox & Friends.

Career
Dean was born in Toronto, Ontario, grew up in Ottawa, and graduated from Algonquin College in Radio-Television Broadcasting. Before starting her career in broadcasting, she worked as a Canadian bylaw enforcement officer. Later Dean worked at several radio and television stations in Canada and the United States, including CHEZ-FM, and WCBS-TV, finally landing a post at Fox News.

In 2009, Dean's application for the American Meteorological Society Seal of Approval was granted. The Seal is not a meteorology diploma, so she is not a meteorologist. Rather, it was launched in 1957 as a way to recognize on-air personalities for their sound delivery of weather information to the general public, and the AMS is no longer accepting applications for the Seal of Approval Program.

Dean wrote a series of Freddy the Frogcaster children's books.

Her first book, Mostly Sunny: How I Learned to Keep Smiling Through the Rainiest Days, was released on March 5, 2019. Her second book, Make Your Own Sunshine: Inspiring Stories of People Who Find Light in Dark Times, was released on March 2, 2021.

Criticisms of Andrew Cuomo
Dean's father-in-law and mother-in-law, each a resident of an assisted living facility or nursing home in New York, died due to complications of COVID-19.  In the aftermath, she attributed both deaths to a State of New York advisory that required admissions and readmissions of assisted living and nursing home residents without virus testing, and became an outspoken high-profile critic of New York's Democratic Governor Andrew Cuomo and the lack of media coverage.

Dean criticized CNN, Good Morning America, and People Magazine; for doing "puff pieces" on Cuomo's actions relative to the pandemic that did not touch on the nursing home subject. She specifically criticized the behavior of both Governor Cuomo and his brother Chris Cuomo (the former presenter of Cuomo Prime Time, which was a weekday-evening news analysis show on CNN that terminated upon CNN firing him) regarding one of the Governor's appearances on his brother's show, describing it as "an insensitive, giggling interview."

The Governor's secretary Melissa DeRosa was among the Cuomo aides who, along with his brother, criticized Dean behind the scenes and tried to create a strategy to paint Dean's commentary as unimportant. It was reported that Chris Cuomo and Melissa DeRosa had plotted to discredit Dean over her criticism of Andrew Cuomo.

Personal life
In 2007 she married Sean Newman of the New York City Fire Department. They have two sons, Matthew and Theodore.

She was diagnosed with multiple sclerosis in 2005.

See also
 New Yorkers in journalism

References

External links
 Bio on FOXNews.com
 Five Minutes w/ Janice Dean (FOXNews.com)

1970 births
Living people
Algonquin College alumni
Weather presenters
Fox News people
People from Toronto
People with multiple sclerosis